Jean Carlos may refer to:

 Jean Carlos (footballer, born 1980), full name Jean Carlos Macedo da Silva, Brazilian football midfielder
 Jean Carlos (footballer, born 1982), full name Jean Carlos da Silva Ferreira, Brazilian football forward
 Jean Carlos (footballer, born 1983), full name Jean Carlos Dondé, Brazilian football defender
 Jean Carlos (footballer, born 1984), full name Jean Carlos Sales Bemvindo, Brazilian football striker
 Jean Carlos (footballer, born 1992), full name Jean Carlos Vicente, Brazilian football midfielder
 Jean Carlos (footballer, born 1996), full name Jean Carlos Silva Rocha, Brazilian football winger
 Jean Carlos Centeno (born 1976), Colombian-Venezuelan singer
 Jean Carlos López (born 1992), Dominican Republic football midfielder
 Jean Carlos Prada (born 1984), Venezuelan boxer
 Jean Carlos Solórzano (born 1988), Costa Rican football forward